Antoinette Des Houlières may refer to:

 Antoinette du Ligier de la Garde Deshoulières (1638–1694), French poet
 Antoinette-Thérèse Des Houlières (1659–1718), French poet, daughter of the above